Thalamura is a 1993 Indian Malayalam language film directed by K. Madhu and starring Mukesh and Madhu.

Cast

Reception
In 2000, Krisha Kumar of Gulf News wrote, "The director sticks to the narrative with a vengeance and colours of village and community life are brought out realistically. The scenes where the father and son desperately seek to bury Lakshmi are touching."

Soundtrack
The music was composed by Johnson.
"Vaalogelukkada Neela" - M. G. Sreekumar, Sujatha Mohan 
"Sundariyam Kannadiyaattil" - M. G. Sreekumar, Minmini
"Neelakkarimbiinte" - Sujatha, M. G. Sreekumar
"Mookavasantham" - K. J. Yesudas

References

External links
 

1993 films
1990s Malayalam-language films
Films directed by K. Madhu
Films scored by Johnson